Monazite is a primarily reddish-brown phosphate mineral that contains rare-earth elements. Due to variability in composition, monazite is considered a group of minerals. The most common species of the group is monazite-(Ce), that is, the cerium-dominant member of the group. It occurs usually in small isolated crystals. It has a hardness of 5.0 to 5.5 on the Mohs scale of mineral hardness and is relatively dense, about 4.6 to 5.7 g/cm3. There are five different most common species of monazite, depending on the relative amounts of the rare earth elements in the mineral:
 monazite-(Ce), (Ce,La,Nd,Th)PO4 (the most common member),
 monazite-(La), (La,Ce,Nd)PO4,
 monazite-(Nd), (Nd,La,Ce)PO4,
 monazite-(Sm), (Sm,Gd,Ce,Th)PO4,
 monazite-(Pr), (Pr,Ce,Nd,Th)PO4.

The elements in parentheses are listed in the order of their relative proportion within the mineral: lanthanum is the most common rare-earth element in monazite-(La), and so forth. Silica (SiO2) is present in trace amounts, as well as small amounts of uranium and thorium. Due to the alpha decay of thorium and uranium, monazite contains a significant amount of helium, which can be extracted by heating.

The following analyses are of monazite from: (I.) Burke County, North Carolina, USA; (II.) Arendal, Norway; (III.) Emmaville, New South Wales, Australia.

Monazite is an important ore for thorium, lanthanum, and cerium.  It is often found in placer deposits. India, Madagascar, and South Africa have large deposits of monazite sands. The deposits in India are particularly rich in monazite.

Monazite is radioactive due to the presence of thorium and, less commonly, uranium. The radiogenic decay of uranium and thorium to lead enables monazite to be dated through monazite geochronology. Monazite crystals often have multiple distinct zones that formed through successive geologic events that lead to monazite crystallization. These domains can be dated to gain insight into the geologic history of its host rocks.

Structure

All monazites adopt the same structure, meaning that the connectivity of the atoms is very similar to other compounds of the type M(III)PO4.  The M(III) centers have a distorted coordination sphere being surrounded by eight oxides with M–O distances around 2.6 Å in length.  The phosphate anion is tetrahedral, as usual.  The same structural motif is observed for lead chromate (PbCrO4).

Mining history

Monazite sand from Brazil was first noticed in sand carried in ship's ballast by Carl Auer von Welsbach in the 1880s. Von Welsbach was looking for thorium for his newly invented incandescent mantles. Monazite sand was quickly adopted as the thorium source and became the foundation of the rare-earth industry.

Monazite sand was also briefly mined in North Carolina, but, shortly thereafter, extensive deposits in southern India were found. Brazilian and Indian monazite dominated the industry before World War II, after which major mining activity transferred to South Africa. There are also large monazite deposits in Australia.

Monazite was the only significant source of commercial lanthanides, but concern over the disposal of the radioactive daughter products of thorium, bastnäsite came to displace monazite in the production of lanthanides in the 1960s due to its much lower thorium content. Increased interest in thorium for nuclear energy may bring monazite back into commercial use.

Mineralization and extraction

Because of their high density, monazite minerals concentrate in alluvial sands when released by the weathering of pegmatites. These so-called placer deposits are often beach or fossil beach sands and contain other heavy minerals of commercial interest such as zircon and ilmenite. Monazite can be isolated as a nearly pure concentrate by the use of gravity, magnetic, and electrostatic separation.

Monazite sand deposits are prevalently of the monazite-(Ce) composition. Typically, the lanthanides in such monazites contain about 45–48% cerium, about 24% lanthanum, about 17% neodymium, about 5% praseodymium, and minor quantities of samarium, gadolinium, and yttrium. Europium concentrations tend to be low, about 0.05%. South African "rock" monazite, from Steenkampskraal, was processed in the 1950s and early 1960s by the Lindsay Chemical Division of American Potash and Chemical Corporation, at the time the largest producer of lanthanides in the world. Steenkampskraal monazite provided a supply of the complete set of lanthanides. Very low concentrations of the heaviest lanthanides in monazite justified the term "rare" earth for these elements, with prices to match.  Thorium content of monazite is variable and sometimes can be up to 20–30%. Monazite from certain carbonatites or from Bolivian tin ore veins is essentially thorium-free. However, commercial monazite sands typically contain between 6 and 12% thorium oxide.

Acid cracking 
Variations in the ratio of acid to ore, the extent of heating, and the extent to which water was added afterwards led to several different processes to separate thorium from the lanthanides. One of the processes caused the thorium to precipitate out as a phosphate or pyrophosphate in crude form, leaving a solution of lanthanide sulfates, from which the lanthanides could be easily precipitated as a double sodium sulfate. The acid methods led to the generation of considerable acid waste, and loss of the phosphate content of the ore.

Alkaline cracking 
This process allows the valuable phosphate content of the ore to be recovered as crystalline trisodium phosphate. The lanthanide/thorium hydroxide mixture can be treated with hydrochloric acid to provide a solution of lanthanide chlorides, and an insoluble sludge of the less-basic thorium hydroxide.

Extraction of rare-earth metals from monazite ore

The extraction of rare-earth metals from monazite ore begins with digestion with sulfuric acid followed by aqueous extraction. The process requires many neutralizations and filtrations.

The final products yielded for this process are thorium-phosphate concentrate, RE hydroxides, and uranium concentrate. Depending on the relative market prices of uranium, thorium, and rare earth elements as well as the availability of customers and the logistics of delivering to them, some or all of those products may be economical to sell or further process into a marketable form, while others constitute tailings for disposal. Products of the uranium and thorium decay series, particularly radium will be present in trace amounts and form a radiotoxic hazard. While radium-228 (a product of thorium decay) will be present only in extremely minute amounts (less than one milligram per metric ton of thorium), and will decay away with a half life of roughly 5.75 years, radium-226 will be present at a ratio above 300 milligrams per metric ton of uranium and due to its long half life (~1600 years) will essentially remain with the residue. As radium forms the least soluble alkaline earth metal sulfate known, radium sulfate will be present among the solid filtration products after sulfuric acid has been added.

References

Further reading
 J. C. Bailar et al., Comprehensive Inorganic Chemistry, Pergamon Press, 1973.
 R. J. Callow, The Industrial Chemistry of the Lanthanons, Yttrium, Thorium and Uranium, Pergamon Press 1967. .
 Gupta, C. K. and N. Krishnamurthy, Extactive Metallurgy of Rare Earths, CRC Press, 2005, .
 Gupta, C. K., and T. K. Mukherjee. Hydrometallurgy in Extraction Processes, Boca Raton, Florida: CRC Press, 1990. Print.
 Price List, Lindsay Chemical Division, American Potash and Chemical Corporation, 1960.
 R. C. Vickery, Chemistry of the Lanthanons, Butterworths and Academic Press, 1953.

External links

 Monazite
 An Unusual State Of Matter Poem about monazite by Roald Hoffman
 "British Monazite Mine, Shelby, N.C." in Durwood Barbour Collection of North Carolina Postcards (P077), North Carolina Collection Photographic Archives, Wilson Library, UNC-Chapel Hill
 ; the third in a series of videos about a Monazite beach in Brazil.
 Monazite, thorium, and mesothorium (1915)

Lanthanide minerals
Thorium minerals
Phosphate minerals
Monoclinic minerals
Minerals in space group 14